Horseshoe Lake is located east of Horseshoe, New York. Fish species present in the lake are tiger muskie, walleye, white sucker, yellow perch, and black bullhead. There are three carry down access sites. Two are located on the west shore off Route 421, and the other on the southeast shore off Route 421.

References

Lakes of New York (state)
Lakes of St. Lawrence County, New York